Swing en tu Idioma (English Swing in your language) is the 17th studio album by Mexican pop singer Mijares. It's a collection of greatest hits of another singers of the Spanish rock genre, in the American swing style.

Track listing
Tracks 
 No Voy en Tren
 Ado
 Persiana Americana
 Quién Me Ha Robado el Mes de Abril
 Lamento Boliviano
 No Dejes Que
 Rayando el Sol
 Lucha de Gigantes
 Triste Canción
 María
 Cuando Seas Grande

Covered Singers
 Charly García
 Miguel Mateos
 El Tri
 Nacha Pop
 Maná
 Caifanes
 Joaquín Sabina
 Soda Stereo
 Café Tacuba
 Enanitos Verdes

Personnel Credits

Background Vocals
 Beto Dominguez
 Mario Santos
 Sheila Ríos

Winds
 Gus Andrews 
 Joe d'Etienne 	
 Alejandro Diaz 	
 Moisés Garcia 	
 Juan Ramos 	
 Abel Sanchez 	
 Rafael Terriquez 	
 Luis Valle 
 Guillermo Gil (didjeridu)

Percussion
 Beto Dominguez
 Gabriel Puentes

Strings
 Paco Rosas

Others
 Charly García & Guillermo Gutiérrez Leyva →A&R
 Memo Gil → Arranger, Loops, Editing, Recording, Mixing
 Mario Santos & Eugenio Toussaint → Piano, Arranger

References

2007 albums
Manuel Mijares albums